Vanessa Panov (born ) is a Canadian group rhythmic gymnast. 
She represents her nation at international competitions.

She competed at world championships, including at the 2015 World Rhythmic Gymnastics Championships.

References

External links
https://database.fig-gymnastics.com/public/gymnasts/biography/22770/true?backUrl=%2Fpublic%2Fresults%2Fdisplay%2F5347%3FidAgeCategory%3D8%26idCategory%3D79%23anchor_44636
http://www.gymcan.org/disciplines/rhythmic/national-teams/vanessa-panov
https://www.gymbc.org/news/post/canadas-artistic-and-rhythmic-teams-announced-for-pan-am-games
http://results.toronto2015.org/IRS/en/gymnastics-rhythmic/athlete-profile-n10177108-panov-vanessa.htm
https://www.youtube.com/watch?v=03-R9stnvBo

1999 births
Living people
Canadian rhythmic gymnasts
Place of birth missing (living people)
Gymnasts at the 2015 Pan American Games
Gymnasts at the 2014 Summer Youth Olympics
Pan American Games medalists in gymnastics
Pan American Games bronze medalists for Canada
Medalists at the 2015 Pan American Games
21st-century Canadian women